Fighting Vipers 2 is a fighting game developed and published by Sega. The game is the sequel to 1995's Fighting Vipers and was released for the Sega Model 3 arcade system in 1998 before being ported to the Dreamcast in 2001.

Gameplay
Along with the original cast of the first game, Fighting Vipers 2 introduced Emi, a computer geek who fights with a self-developed mecha armor, and Charlie, a BMX rider. New unlockable characters included Del Sol (a Mexican wrestler with a Sun mask), and Kuhn (a copycat character with various movesets from all the other original characters similar to Virtua Fighters Dural).

Development
AM2's Hiroshi Kataoka told Sega Saturn Magazine that development began in early 1997 after work on Fighters Megamix for the Saturn had concluded, and lasted for ten months. Members of the development team visited Alcatraz early on in the project for inspiration for the caged stages and the character designs were inspired by the "fashionable sports that are being played by young people today, such as BMX riding and skateboarding along with their associated music culture". Motion capture was utilised for the opening sequences and winning and losing poses, but the majority of animation was done by hand.

Release
The game was planned for a U.S. release but was later cancelled.

The game was praised for being a perfect Dreamcast port of the original Model 3 Arcade game (unlike Virtua Fighter 3tb which was a loose port), however the developers did not include any additional extras for this release, making it a straight port.

Reception
In Japan, Game Machine listed Fighting Vipers 2 on their June 15, 1998 issue as being the second most-successful arcade game of the month.

Jim Preston reviewed the Dreamcast version of the game for Next Generation, rating it three stars out of five, and stated that "Dreamcast software sales were always sluggish in Japan, and with mediocre titles like this it's not hard to see why."

On release, Famitsu magazine scored the Dreamcast version of the game a 30 out of 40.

References

1998 video games
3D fighting games
Arcade video games
Dreamcast games
Fighting games
Multiplayer video games
Sega video games
Sega-AM2 games
Sega arcade games
Video games scored by Hidenori Shoji
Video games developed in Japan